Bais, officially the City of Bais, is a 3rd class component city in the province of Negros Oriental, Philippines. According to the 2020 census, it has a population of 84,317 people.

Etymology
In the early days of Spanish exploration, some Spaniards came upon a swampy land and docked their boats at the vicinity of the two small islets that guarded the village. While exploring the place, they saw natives fishing along the coast. The Spaniards approached the natives and asked for the name of the place. The natives could not understand Spanish, and believing that the Spaniards were asking for the name of their catch, the natives answered saying "Ba-is"; from that day on, this swampy valley of the Old Panlabangan and Talamban Hills became known as Bais.

History

Pioneer in the sugar industry
Negros Oriental's economy was far from progressive, and its rich soil was not utilized to its full capacity in the 1850s. During those years, people in Negros Island are depicted as having a life of content for they tended to produce only enough goods to meet their daily needs. Even before the sugar boom of the 1850s, Negros Oriental was already producing sugar. The transport of most of its product was mainly done from the ports of Iloilo, which explains the fast moving pace of development of the sugar industry in Negros Occidental, primarily due to its proximity to Iloilo. This situation was a disadvantage on the movement of sugar from the oriental plantations further away to the east.

According to Bais historian, Penn Tulabing Larena, a wide array of difficulties barred the development of the sugar industry in the Oriental part of the island. The pioneer sugar traders and adventurers include José Rodrigo Camilo Rubio and Diego García-Baena - both from Cádiz, Agustín de Sandes from Mexico, Aniceto Villanueva from Spain and Vicente-Anunciación Te (who later adopted the surname Teves, from Amoy Province, China). After hearing about the fertility of the flatland of Bais, these individuals carved away the virgin forests of the eastern side of the island. Many came and settled in the area and planted sugar cane, thus producing muscovado sugar (invented by Vicente-Anunciación Teves) from their mills which was then exported to Spain via Iloilo, the principal shipping point in the Visayas. This was loaded in large sailboats called lurchas or Batel built by Aniceto Villanueva and Joaquín Montenegro.

Bais credits much of its progress to the Central Azucarera de Bais, the largest producer of raw sugar in Negros Oriental. Established by the Real Compañía-General de Tabacos de Filipinas, S.A. of Spain in the early 1900s, it is also the pioneer in the sugar industry in the Philippines. This industry reached its peak in the 1930s bringing affluence to the Negrenses and enabling them to build stately homes and to acquire properties all over the province.

Driving through the city's main national highway, sugar plantations can immediately be seen on both sides of the road. These areas are characterized by expansive lowlands that stretch as far as the eyes can see and are ideal for sugar planting because of the city's naturally fertile soil. It is no wonder why 73% of the city's total land area is devoted primarily to agriculture.

The Central Azucarera de Bais itself is an old foreboding structure of metal and hard wood. The offices may have seen better days, the dank smell of nostalgia hang heavy in the air, but are still functional. Nearby is the Casa Grande, an equally old residential compound surrounded by tall acacia trees, which was built for the use of the employees of the Azucarera. The two-storey wooden houses are greatly influenced by old Spanish design and architecture. Much of the houses have undergone restoration and continue to be used as homes of the representatives of the executives of the new management.

Further south are the stately plantation houses owned by sugar planters, mostly standing on one of the lots in the family hacienda. Inside the haciendas are chapels whose altar and icons date back to 1917. Educational visits to these places may be arranged at the Bais City Tourism Office. Visitors get to tour via the old railroad trams used by the milling companies to hasten sugar cane transport.

Geography

There are two bays in the area, hence the name "Bais." The shore line is mostly mangroves, which are in danger of destruction due to the increasing population. The richness of marine life in the bays is because of these mangroves.

Bais’s name is derived from the Visayan word "ba-is" for brackish-water eel – a fish species native to the city and one which has become the city's delicacy. A former barrio and later a municipality, Bais, officially became a city on September 9, 1968 (R.A. No. 5444).

The territorial jurisdiction of Bais includes two islets (Olympia and Dewey) and the Bais Bay. The Bais Bay area holds a diversity of animal life and is a rich breeding and fishing ground for demersal and other fish species, and also invertebrates. South Bais Bay is also famous for dolphin watching.

The Pelarta River runs beside the city center. There is, however, a dispute that the name Bais was taken after the eels locally called "bais" that used to thrive in this river. The river has been the source of irrigation water for the nearby sugar farms. This has been vital in the success of sugar plantations in this area. This river also has a big influence on the city's geography, as it deposits sediments in the former mangrove areas during the (formerly annual) flood season. These former mangrove swamps have now dried out and become populated with residents. In the late 1970s, under the Genaro Goñi administration, a river control system stretching from the city center toward the low-lying areas was established in order to lessen flooding during the rainy season.

Barangays
Bais is politically subdivided into 35 barangays.

Climate

Demographics

Economy

Bais is the largest producer of raw sugar in Negros Oriental. There are two sugar mills in the city. The Central Azucarera de Bais was established by Tabacalera of Spain in the early 1918 and is the oldest in the country. The other mill is URSUMCO (Universal Robina Sugar Milling Corporation) which was formerly known as UPSUMCO (United Planters Milling Corporation) and constructed in the mid-1970s by Marubeni Corporation of Japan as a project of Ignacio Montenegro (also of Spanish roots). An ethanol plant of the Universal Robina Corporation (URC) that produces bioethanol for the local market has recently been inaugurated.

Culture

An annual fiesta is held each year on September 10 in honor of the city's patron saint San Nicolás de Tolentino, a celebration inherited from the Spanish era. On this occasion, most of the residents prepare food for anyone who visits - a tradition practiced not only in Bais but also in most towns and cities in the Philippines. Lately, the celebration has included mardigras and parades.

Seventy-three percent of the city's total land area is devoted to agriculture and the local economy is dominated by agricultural activities and output. The existing urban area in the city covers only 109.12 hectares. Sugar is the major commercial crop in the city. About 36% of the city's agricultural land is planted in sugarcane, yielding 1.16 million gross kilograms annually for the domestic and foreign markets. Bais is also home to two sugar mills or centrals: Central Azucarera de Bais and URSUMCO.

Fish production is the city's second income earner, with about 428 hectares of the land area devoted to fishpond development and operation and fish culture. Bangus (milkfish) culture is the dominant activity. In 2000, the bangus yield in the city was at 722 tons.

The government of Bais operates ecotourism activities in the city, highlighted by whale and dolphin watching and nature treks. Two annual Bais festivals have also become tourism events: the Hudyaka sa Bais Mardigras (which was changed to Sipong Festival and later on changed back to Hudyaka) and the Christmas Festival (which showcases the city's, perhaps the province's only, giant rotating Christmas tree and colorful decors) since 1950.

A concern of the city is its liquid and solid waste management. At present, liquid wastes are emptied directly without treatment into the Bais basin. The current dump site for solid waste is due for closure, and site development for a new 12.5-hectare sanitary landfill is being finalized.

Bais is reported to be the last stronghold of the Spanish language in the Philippines, since some of the Spaniards are in the first settlement area of Negros, (and southeast of Bais) Tanjay.

Education
Bais has separated its DepEd Division (Department of Education) from the provincial division. Most of its 35 barangays have their respective public elementary schools, and only a few have public secondary schools. In the city proper, elementary and secondary public schools, a college, and a state university are situated.

Colleges & Universities
Negros Oriental State University Campus 1 – Sitio San Jose, Barangay II, Bais
Negros Oriental State University Campus 2 – Quezon Avenue, National Highway, Bais
La Consolacion College Bais (Formerly Sacred Heart Academy) – E.C. Villanueva St., Barangay II, Bais

Elementary & Secondary Schools

Amalao Elementary School
Bais City Pilot School – Special Class in the Arts
Bais City Pilot School – Special Class in School Sports
Bais City Pilot School – SpED Center
Bais City Pilot School – Regular Class
Bais City Special Science Elementary School
Bais City West Primary School
Biso Elementary School
Basak Elementary School
Cabanlutan Elementary School
Cambagahan Elementary School
Cambanjao Elementary School
Cambayungon Elementary School
Cambuilao Primary School
Cansanag Elementary School
Cipriano Alcala Memorial Elementary School
Dansulan Elementary School
Dr. Ernesto M. Yared Sr. Memorial Elementary School
Javier Laxina I Memorial High School
Lowason Elementary School
Lonoy Elementary School 
Sab-ahan Elementary School
 San Vicente Elementary School
Tabu-ac Elementary School
Katacgahan Primary School
Olympia Elementary School
Looc Elementary School
Praxevilla Elementary School
Santo Tomas Elementary School
Santo Tomas National High School
Tagpo Elementary School
Talungon Primary School
Tangculogan Elementary School
Okiot Elementary School
Okiot National High School
Bais City National High School with 6 existing satellite campuses across the 35 barangays
Bais City National Science High School
La Consolacion College (High School Department)
Tabu-ac Elementary School
Palanging Elementary School
Panalaan National High School
Panalaan Elementary School

Notable personalities

Demetrio Larena Sr. – first Governor of Negros Oriental
Chanda Romero – Actress, TV Personality
Valeen Montenegro Vicente – Actress TV Personality
Eddie Romero – National Artist for Film and Broadcast Arts
Jose Mari Chan – Singer, Songwriter and Businessman in the sugar industry

References

External links

 [ Philippine Standard Geographic Code]
 Philippine Census Information
 Local Governance Performance Management System

Cities in Negros Oriental
Component cities in the Philippines